The Armenian Cathedral of the Assumption of Mary in Lviv, Ukraine is located in the city's Old Town, north of the market square. Until 1945 it was the cathedral of the Armenian Catholic Archdiocese of Lviv, since 2000 it serves as a cathedral of the Eparchy of Ukraine of the Armenian Apostolic Church.

History

1363-1945
A small Armenian church was built in the years 1363–1370, founded by an Armenian merchant from Caffa, and established as the mother church of an eparchy. It is said to have been modeled after the Cathedral of Ani in the ancient Armenian capital of Ani. In 1437 the cathedral was surrounded with an arcade gallery: today only the southern one is preserved and the northern has been rebuilt into a sacristy. After the church was damaged in a city fire in 1527, a new stone belfry was erected in 1571. In 1630 the main nave was extended, and was further rebuilt in 1723. From the 17th century until 1945, the cathedral belonged to the Armenian Catholic archdiocese of Lviv (in Polish, Lwów), as union with the Roman Catholic Church was introduced by bishop Mikołaj (Nicolas) Torosowicz and his successor, archbishop Vartan Hunanyan. The Cathedral owes most of its present-day look to a remodeling carried out in the years 1908-1927 by archbishop Józef (Joseph) Teodorowicz.

1945–present
Lviv (named Lwów in Polish) was in the eastern part of the territory reconstituted as Poland in 1919–20; and after World War II, that portion of the territory was taken from Poland and annexed by the Soviet Union, becoming part of the Ukrainian Soviet Socialist Republic. In 1945 the new Soviet authorities decided to annihilate the Armenian Catholic Archdiocese of Lviv, and arrested its last administrator, the Rev. Dionizy Kajetanowicz (murdered in the Soviet gulag in 1954) and three other priests. Almost all the Polish Armenians were expelled to the west, to modern-day Poland. The cathedral was closed, and its building was used for storing plundered sacral art. Officially, the Armenian Catholic Archdiocese of Lviv still exists, but it has remained vacant since 1938.

After the collapse of the Soviet Union, a handful of Armenian Catholic families attempted to reestablish the parish. Also the Armenians who came to Lviv during the Soviet times, belonging to the Armenian Apostolic Church, sought to acquire the cathedral.

Shortly before the visit of Pope John Paul II, the local Ukrainian authorities passed the cathedral to the Armenian Apostolic Church under the condition both the Armenian Catholic and Armenian Apostolic communities could use it. An Armenian Apostolic eparchy was established in Lviv in 1997.

On 18 May 2003 the cathedral was re-consecrated by the Catholicos of All Armenians Karekin II and three other Armenian Apostolic bishops. Among the guests were: speaker of the Armenian parliament Armen Khachatryan, former president of Ukraine Leonid Kravchuk, president of the Union of Armenians in Ukraine, French singer of Armenian origin Charles Aznavour with his son, Armenian actor Armen Dzhigarkhanyan and Armenian Ambassador to Ukraine Hrachya Silvanyan. Ukrainian Orthodox Church of the Moscow Patriarchate was represented by bishop Augustin.
Ukrainian Greek Catholic Church was represented by rev. Mikhail Dymyd. In the name of the Ukrainian government the head of the Religions State Agency Victor Bondarenko was present. However, neither Polish Armenians - the former owners of the cathedral, nor Armenian Catholic Church clergymen were invited.

Since 2009 the cathedral has been in course of a renovation process, fully financed by the Polish Ministry of Culture in cooperation with the Foundation of Culture and Heritage of Polish Armenians seated in Warsaw. The works are being conducted jointly by Polish and Ukrainian specialists.

Interior and surroundings
Just north of the Cathedral lies a small convent of Armenian Benedictines, and to the south, adjoining the bell tower, the palace of the Armenian Archbishops, both built in the late 17th century.

The present-day interior is largely the work of Jan Henryk Rosen and Józef Mehoffer. The cathedral holds two wonder-working icons of St. Gregory the Illuminator and the Mother of God, brought in the 17th century from Yazlovets.

See also

Armenians in Ukraine
Armenians in Poland

External links 
 Photo gallery of Armenian Cathedral of Lviv

References

14th-century churches in Ukraine
Churches completed in 1571
Churches completed in 1723
Churches completed in 1927
Armenian Apostolic churches in Ukraine
Cathedrals in Lviv
Former Armenian Catholic churches
Church buildings converted to a different denomination
Armenian Apostolic cathedrals in Ukraine
Dioceses established in the 14th century
1370 in Europe
1571 establishments in the Polish–Lithuanian Commonwealth
18th-century churches in Ukraine
20th-century churches in Ukraine